Zac Carlson (born August 8, 1987) is a former gridiron football offensive lineman. He most recently played for the Calgary Stampeders of the Canadian Football League. He was drafted by the Hamilton Tiger-Cats in the first round of the 2009 CFL Supplemental Draft, meaning that they would forfeit their first round selection in the 2010 CFL Draft. After his release in training camp in 2010, he signed with the Stampeders on June 25, 2010. He played college football for Weber State.  In his spare time, he enjoys spending quality time at his cabin in Sandy Hook, Manitoba.

References

External links
Calgary Stampeders bio

1987 births
Living people
Calgary Stampeders players
Canadian football offensive linemen
Canadian players of American football
Canadian football people from Winnipeg
Players of Canadian football from Manitoba
Hamilton Tiger-Cats players
Weber State Wildcats football players